Maria Lucia Moreno Lozañes (Manila, December 13, 1976), better known by her stage name MaLoY, is a Spanish Filipino singer. She was the second female singer of the German Eurodance act Captain Jack from 1998 until 2001. After taking a break from the record music scene, she returned in 2006 with the German DJ act Shaun Baker.

Discography

 1997 – - Toybox
 "Love To The Limit" (Single)
 1999 – - Captain Jack
 "Dream A Dream" (Single)
 "Get Up" (Single) – - featuring the "Gipsy Kings"
 "The Captain's Revenge" (Album)
 2000 – - Captain Jack
 "Only You" (Single)
 2007 – - Shaun Baker
 "V.I.P." (Single)
 "POWER" (Single)
 2008 – - Shaun Baker
 "Hey, Hi, Hello" (Single)
 "Could You, Would You, Should You" (Single)
 2009 – - Shaun Baker
 "Give" (Single)
 2010 – - Shoot! Music feat. MaLoY
 "Step 2 the Music" (Single)
 DIVERSE
 Dance Dance Revolution – - KONAMI Video Game
 Tonight Is The Night – - Le Click Album – - dubbing vocals only

Releases
 SINGLES – - (1997–2000) "Love To The Limit" (Toybox) – - released only in Germany (1997)
 "Dream A Dream" (Captain Jack) – - reached Top 97 of the German Billboard Charts (May 3, 1999)
 "Get Up" (Captain Jack featuring the "Gipsy Kings") – - reached Top 23 of the German Billboard Charts (July 23, 1999)
 "Only You" (Captain Jack) (Nov. 11, 1999)
 SINGLES – - (2007–2010) "V.I.P." (Shaun Baker) – - reached Top 2 of the Official German Download Dance Charts & went to No. 1 in Poland & Czech Republic(March 1, 2007) – - released only for Download
 "POWER" (Shaun Baker) – - reached No. 1 on the German iTunes Dance Charts, Austrian iTunes Dance Charts & Deutsche DJ Charts(Oct. 1, 2007) – - released only for Download
 "Hey, Hi, Hello" (Shaun Baker) – - winning song of (Sopot Hit Festival) 2008 in Poland on Aug. 9, 2008.
 "Could You, Would You, Should You" (Shaun Baker) – - released on Nov. 28, 2008
 "Give" (Shaun Baker) – - released in Germany on May 29, 2009
 "Step 2 the Music" (Shoot! Music feat. MaLoY) – - released in Germany on March 17, 2010
 ALBUMS (1999–2005)
 "The Captain's Revenge" (Captain Jack)(1999)
 "The Race" (Captain Jack) – - released only in Japan(1999)
 "Greatest Hits" (Captain Jack) (2005)
 "Captain's Best" (Captain Jack) – - Japan releaseBest Hits & New Songs Album
 "ONE" (Shaun Baker)
 COMPILATION ALBUMS
 Dance Dance Revolution – - KONAMI Video Game
 CHARITY CD
 Together – - Artists Together for Kosovo – - Charity song with other German artists for the children of Kosovo
 DUBBING VOCALS
 Tonight Is The Night – - Le Click Album

Television appearances
 1999:
 "Summer Special in Mallorca, SPAIN" with Ricky Martin, Backstreet Boys, Lou Bega, Geri Halliwell, Sophia Loren, Tyra Banks and many more.
 Wetten, dass..?
 VIVA Interaktiv
 ZDF Chart Attack
 ARD Immer Wieder Sonntags
 ZDF Fernsehgarten
 NBC GIGA
 WDR Die Sendung Mit der Maus

See also
Eurodance
Spanish Filipino

References

External links
 Official website of MaLoY
 Live Videos

Eurodance musicians
German techno musicians
Video game musicians
Musicians from Manila
Filipino people of Spanish descent
Living people
1976 births
Lozanes, Maloy
Filipino expatriates in Germany
Filipino dance musicians
English-language singers from Germany
21st-century German women singers
21st-century Filipino women singers